Paracoumaryl alcohol is a phytochemical, one of the monolignols. It is a white solid. p-Coumaryl alcohol is a major precursor to lignin or lignans.

Biosynthesis and occurrence
It is synthesized via the phenylpropanoid biochemical pathway. 

Esters of p-coumaryl alcohol and fatty acids are the basis of epicuticular waxes covering the surfaces of apples.

p-Coumaryl alcohol is an intermediate in biosynthesis of chavicol, stilbenoids, and coumarin.

External links
 Molecule of the week: p-coumaryl alcohol

References

Monolignols